Damien Lacey (born 3 August 1977) is a Welsh former footballer who played in the Football League for Swansea City. He was born in Bridgend.

Stats 
He plays midfielder, right back. In 2001—along with seven other players—he took a pay cut due to the troubles throughout the Third Division Club. This was more than 70 percent.

References

External links
 

Welsh footballers
English Football League players
Swansea City A.F.C. players
1977 births
Living people
Association football midfielders